Notre-Dame-de-l'Île-Perrot is the largest of four municipalities located on Île Perrot, west of the island of Montreal, Quebec. The population as of the Canada 2016 Census was 10,654. It hosts the island's first church built in 1740 originally situated at Pointe-du-Moulin which was reconstituted as the Chapelle du Souvenir in 1953 beside the church of Sainte-Jeanne-de-Chantal across from the town hall.

History
The island was granted as a seigneury on October 29, 1672, to François-Marie Perrot (1644-1691), captain in the Picardy Regiment and governor of Montreal in 1670.

In 1949, the Parish Municipality of Notre-Dame-de-l'Île-Perrot was formed out of the Parish Municipality of L'Île-Perrot. A year later, it lost part of its territory when the Village Municipality of Pincourt was created.

On December 18, 1986, the Town of Pointe-du-Moulin (founded in 1958) was amalgamated into Notre-Dame-de-l'Île-Perrot, which changed statutes from parish municipality to (regular) municipality in 1998, and became a ville in 2004.

Demographics 

Local government
List of former mayors:

 Michel Tarte (2001–2005)
 Serge Roy (2005–2009)
 Marie-Claude Nichols (2009–2014)
 Danie Deschênes (2014–present)

Transportation
There is a shuttle bus service operated by CIT La Presqu'Île connecting to the Vaudreuil-Hudson commuter rail line.

Education
Commission Scolaire des Trois-Lacs operates Francophone schools.
 École de la Samare
 École Notre-Dame-de-la-Garde
 Some areas are zoned to École La Perdriolle in L'Île-Perrot

Lester B. Pearson School Board operates Anglophone schools. A part of the community is zoned to Dorset Elementary School in Baie-d'Urfé and another is zoned to Edgewater Elementary School and St. Patrick Elementary School in Pincourt.

See also
 List of cities in Quebec

References

External links

 Official website

Cities and towns in Quebec
Incorporated places in Vaudreuil-Soulanges Regional County Municipality
Greater Montreal